Karkhana is a Locality in the city of Secunderabad, India. The region has experienced a real estate boom in recent years and has become a base for a number of small IT start-ups. It can be reached easily by public transport and is well connected to surrounding areas.

Sub regions
Karkhana is divided up into several colonies - Vikrampuri Colony, AP Textbook Colony, Venkat Ram Nagar (PAO ORS Colony), State Bank Colony, Gunrock Enclave, Vasavi Nagar, R n D Defence Colony, Priya Colony, Brooke Bond Colony, Jyothi Colony and many more.

Transport
TSRTC connects Karkhana to Secunderabad Station, Paradise, thereby connecting commuters to all parts of the city. Jubilee Bus Station (JBS) is just one km distance away. JBS has a well connected network to many places in the Telangana and neighbouring states. The Hyderabad Metro Rail has a station at JBS Parade ground.

The closest MMTS Train station is at Secunderabad.

Neighbourhoods in Hyderabad, India
Geography of Secunderabad